Coeur d'Alene (Cœur d'Alène, Snchitsu’umshtsn) is a Salishan language. It was spoken by only two of the 80 individuals in the Coeur d'Alene Tribe on the Coeur d'Alene Reservation in northern Idaho, United States in 1999.  It is considered an endangered language. However, as of 2014, two elders in their 90s remain who grew up with Cœur d'Alène as their first language, and the use of the language is spreading among all age groups.

The Coeur d'Alene Names-Places Project visits geographic sites on the reservation recording video, audio, and still photos of Tribal elders who describe the site in both English and Coeur d'Alene languages.

The Coeur d'Alene Tribal Language Program and elders have actively promoted the use of the language, and have created computer sounds that use Snchitsu’umshtsn phrases. Radio station KWIS FM 88.3 in Plummer, Idaho offers programming to preserve the Snchitsu’umshtsn language.

Lawrence Nicodemus, "a retired judge and former tribal council member,"  became a scholar of the language. He had worked with linguist Gladys Reichard in his youth, and went on to create a grammar, dictionary, and instructional materials. Nicodemus taught language classes until his death at age 94. The Coeur d'Alene Tribe's language program has "taught classes and worked with the language department to record more than 2,000 hours of audio and video." Classes are also available at North Idaho College.

Orthography 

There are three different orthographies, giving the interpretations of previous scholarly works.  Coeur d'Alene examples have been taken from the works of Nicodemus et al. as well as from the COLRC website.

Notes on writing systems
 LPO, the linguistic phonetic orthography, is a third orthographic system based on a variant of the International Phonetic Alphabet (IPA). Many Salishan scholars, such as Lyon Greenwood, call the LPO orthography the Salishan orthography. This system will also be used by the Coeur d'Alene Dictionaries Project in conjunction with the Bitar system.
 Bitar is another name referring to Lawrence Nicodemus's orthography. Lawrence Nicodemus was one of Gladys Reichard's language consultants, and in collaboration with Joseph Bitar of the Southwest Research Associates of Albuquerque, he created a second orthography, which is less accurate phonetically but reflects the native speaker's interpretation of the sounds, symbols, and words of Coeur d'Alene. 
 Gladys Reichard and James Teit, students of Franz Boas. Reichard conducted early scholarly work of the Coeur d'Alene. Reichard and Teit developed an orthographic system, slightly varied from the Boasian system, which was consistent with phonetic transcriptions of native speakers Reichard worked with as well as consistent with transcriptions from Teit's previous data. This system has come to be known as the Reichard orthography. 
  In Doak and Montler, /e/ is used in the LPO orthography, equated with /ɛ/. Doak explains that /ɛ/ ranges freely between [e], [ɛ], and [æ] with /ɛ/ being the most common variant. This gives clarity to her variance in representing the sound in vowel inventories of her website and her dissertation as /e/ or /ɛ/. 
 Doak and Montler, Doak, and Doak use the notation /x̣/ while Lyon uses the notation /x̌/ to indicate the same phoneme and orthographic symbol. Okanagan also utilizes the wedge notation for this same phoneme: /x̌/.
 Standard Salishan (LPO) and Doak uses the notation /ɬ/ while Lyon, and Greenwood, Nicodemus et al., and Reichard used the notation /ł/ in consonant inventories and orthographies in reference to the same sound which Doak describes as bilateral.

Phonology

Consonants
In Coeur d'Alene, there are eleven places of articulation: labial, alveolar, palatoalveolar, lateral, labiovelar, uvular, labio-uvular, coronal pharyngeal, pharyngeal, labiopharyngeal, and laryngeal. Doak identifies six manners of articulation: plain and glottalized voiceless stops and affricates, voiced stops and affricate, voiceless fricatives, and plain and glottalized resonants.

Vowels

Morphology and syntax

Coeur d'Alene is a morphosyntactically polysynthetic language. In Coeur d'Alene, a full clause can be expressed by affixing pronominal arguments and morphemes expressing aspect, transitivity and tense onto one verb stem (Doak,[13] 1997, p. 38). These affixes are discussed below.

Basic intransitive clause structure
The basic format of an intransitive thought as Doak identifies can be found below:

Intransitive person markers
The intransitive subjects of Coeur d'Alene appear as clitics (Doak, 1997, p. 53), and their forms as well as examples from Doak (1997, p. 53-54) are found below:

Plural –ilš
To clarify, the parentheses used around the suffix, -ilš, are meant to show that it is optional. This 3rd person plural, optional morpheme is used to give clarity that something within the sentence has plurality, whether it is the subject or the object is a matter of context. To illustrate this more clearly, Doak (1997, p. 59) gives the example:

Determiners
There are three determiners and one oblique marker that help specify participants by joining clauses and their main predicates. Doak (1997, p. 46-48).

As a general rule, adjuncts that are introduced with a determiner specify the absolutive, accusative and nominative pronominal arguments, while both the determiner and oblique marker introduce ergative arguments. When an indefinite participant is not indicated on the predicate, the oblique alone is used to indicate this participant. — Doak (1997, p. vii)

Examples:

Basic transitive clause structure
The construction of a transitive sentence in Coeur d'Alene is:

Transitivizers
There are three types of transitives in Coeur d'Alene: simple, causative, and applicative. The different transitivizers in Coeur d'Alene are listed below as described by Bischoff (2011, p. 27 modified).

The lone -t and directive -nt transitivizers
The lone -t (-t) and the directive transitivizer -nt (-dt) are the most commonly used in Coeur d'Alene (Bischoff, 2011, p. 27). Doak (1997, p. 115) suggests that these two are alternative forms of one another with the lone -t appearing before a limited number of roots. The person markers that follow these forms are the same in function and form: agent subjects and patient objects. Most often, these transitivizers indicate that the subject is an agent in control of his or her actions (Bischoff, 2011, p. 27).

Causative transitivizer -st(u)
The causative transitivizer -st(u) (-ct) has three primary functions. It is used to indicate customary aspect, causative construction where the subject causes something or someone to be something, and topical object construction (Doak, 1997, p. 124). A unique set of m-initial objects for first and second person singular replace the s-initial morphemes when the construction is with a causative -st(u) transitivizer (Bischoff, 2011, p. 29).

Applicative transitivizers
Applicative transitivizers introduce a third participant into the argument structure, and alter the role of the object. This means the participant represented by the object person marking morpheme serves as a possessor or dative with the possessor applicative transitivizer -łt (-pra) and as a beneficiary or dative with the benefactive transitivizer -š(i)t (-bt). There is also a third, much less frequent, applicative -tułt. can also indicate a dative construction, indicating the object to which something is given. It is also worthwhile to note that third person arguments are only understood from context because Coeur d'Alene only marks two arguments on the predicate using person marking morphemes (Bischoff, 2011, p. 30).

Possessor applicative transitivizer -łt
In transitive constructions with the possessor applicative -łt (-pra), the object marking on the predicate indicates the possessor, rather than the possessed, such as in Examples 1a and 1b below. In some cases, as in Example 1c below, -łt (-pra) serves to indicate a dative construction. In these cases, the role of the object shifts to dative (Bischoff, 2011, p. 30-31).

Benefactive applicative transitivizer -š(i)t
In constructions with the benefactive applicative -š(i)t (-bt), the argument indicated by the ergative is agent and that  by accusative/absolutive the beneficiary. The benefactive applicative may also function to characterize an object as a recipient (Bischoff, 2011, p. 31).

Dative applicative transitivizer -tułt
The dative applicative -tułt is very rare, and the role of this applicative is uncertain other than that it introduces another participant into a sentence structure (Doak, 1997, p. 157). The only examples Doak gives only occur with third person or non-topic ergative person marking morphemes (Bischoff, 2011, p. 32).

Transitive person markers
Below are the transitive object morphemes, which appear as suffixes. The 3rd person is null. The following examples are taken from Doak (1997, p. 55-64).

Notes on Transitive Objects
The alternate forms of the 1st person singular accusative -sɛl/-mɛl and 2nd person singular accusative -si/-mi are selected with respect to the transitivizer used in the predicate, those occurring with m primarily occur with the causative transitivizer -st(u)- while all other transitivizers take those with s form. (Bischoff, 2011, p. 16)
The /l/ in parentheses indicates optionality in phonetic articulation, due to phonological reductions. The phoneme /l/ appears as in examples 1a and 1b before the non-topic ergative object -m and with the 2nd person plural ergative subject -p.

Transitive object examples

          			

There is also a second set of transitive objects in Coeur d'Alene also appear as suffixes, which Doak identifies as non-topic ergative objects (NTE). Following examples from Doak (1997, p. 57-63)

Non-topic ergative object examples

The transitive subjects of Ergative case also appear as suffixes in Coeur d'Alene, and examples from Doak (1997, p. 56-63) are given below.

Ergative transitive subject examples

Genitive structures are used to create possessives in Coeur d'Alene (Doak 1997, p. 169). Examples below are taken from Doak (1997, p. 69-71).

Genitive pronoun examples

Predicate Pronominal forms may stand alone as predicates or may serve as emphatic adjuncts. The forms are constructed as intransitive predicates with morphology and unanalyzable roots used nowhere else, and examples are given below (Doak, 1997, p. 72-73).

Predicate pronominal examples

Aspect
There are three aspects in Coeur d'Alene. The first is the completive, which has no morpheme marker. The completive aspect refers to an action that was completed in the past (Bischoff, 2011, p. 22; Reichard, 1938, p. 574). 

The second is the customary aspect, characterized by the prefix morpheme, ʔɛc- (Doak, 1997, p. 85).

The third aspect is the continuative, indicated by the prefix morpheme y’c-.

Tense
In addition to aspect in Coeur d'Alene, there is evidence of realis and irrealis. Realis and irrealis marks a distinction between time that the speaker can directly perceive through his or her own knowledge or senses (realis)  and that which is conjectured  known of hypothetically, distantly, or by  hearsay (irrealis). Only examples of irrealis are attested in Coeur d'Alene (Doak 1997,[13]  p. 188).

Irrealis is indicated in the same way as an aspect marker, by a particle occurring before the verb. The irrealis particle is  nεʔ. There are no examples of both an aspect marker and irrealis occurring in the same predicate (Doak 1997, [13] p. 189).

References

 Nicodemus, Lawrence (1975). Snchitsu’umshtsn: The Coeur d'Alene Language : a Modern Course, Albuquerque, NM Southwest Research Associates.

TR:transitivizer
DIR:directive
POSS:possessor

External links

 Hnqwa̱'qwe'elm—Coeur d'Alene language website
 Coeur d'Alene Language Resource Center originally created by Shannon Bischoff and Musa Yassin Fort in 2009.
 Reichard's Coeur d'Alene Texts with a brief grammar overview
 Coeur d'Alene Indian Language (Schitsu'Umsh, Skitswish) at native-languages.org

 OLAC resources in and about the Coeur d'Alene language

Endangered indigenous languages of the Americas
Interior Salish languages
Indigenous languages of Idaho
Vowel-harmony languages